Seth Adam Greisinger (born July 29, 1975) is a former professional baseball pitcher. He played in Major League Baseball from –.

Amateur career
Greisinger graduated from McLean High School in Virginia, then played his college ball at the University of Virginia. In 1994 and 1995, he played collegiate summer baseball with the Brewster Whitecaps of the Cape Cod Baseball League and was named a league all-star in 1995. He was selected by the Detroit Tigers in the first round of the 1996 MLB Draft.

Professional career
He played for the Tigers, Minnesota Twins, and Atlanta Braves. He was a non-roster invitee to spring training with the Washington Nationals in 2005; he was sent to the Braves as part of a conditional deal.

Greisinger became the ace for the Tokyo Yakult Swallows in the Central League in Japan for the  season, but Yakult's low budget led to them being forced to release both Greisinger and outfielder Alex Ramirez. Greisinger signed with the Yomiuri Giants for the  season and led the Central League in wins with 17.  In 2009, Greisinger went 13–6 with a 3.47 ERA, but missed time near the end of the season due to inflammation in his right (pitching) elbow.  He did not pitch at all in the postseason and missed the 2009 Japan Series.

Greisinger continued his next two seasons with the Yomiuri Giants with injury-plagued seasons.  He finished the 2010 season with an 0–2 record and a 5.48 ERA in only six games.  He pitched in nine games during the 2011 season and was 1–5 with a 4.15 ERA.

For the 2012 season, Greisinger pitched for the Chiba Lotte Marines and turned back the clock.  He finished the season 12–8 with a 2.24 ERA in over 168 innings.  During the 2013 campaign, he only pitched in 13 games and finished the season at 5–4 with a 4.54 ERA.

Through his seven seasons in Japan, Greisinger had a 64–42 record with a 3.16 ERA in 885 innings.

International career
Greisinger was a member of the 1996 Summer Olympic baseball team, winning a bronze medal.

Personal life
Greisinger married Joana Bennett in a ceremony in Florida. Joana is a Technology Consultant at Accenture and President of a Non-Profit Organization called One Vision One World.

References

External links

Career statistics and player information from Korea Baseball Organization

1975 births
Living people
American expatriate baseball players in Japan
American expatriate baseball players in South Korea
Sportspeople from Kansas City, Kansas
KBO League pitchers
Major League Baseball pitchers
Nippon Professional Baseball pitchers
Baseball players from Kansas
Atlanta Braves players
Brewster Whitecaps players
Chiba Lotte Marines players
Detroit Tigers players
Erie SeaWolves players
Jacksonville Suns players
Kia Tigers players
Lakeland Tigers players
Minnesota Twins players
Richmond Braves players
Rochester Red Wings players
Toledo Mud Hens players
Tokyo Yakult Swallows players
Virginia Cavaliers baseball players
Yomiuri Giants players
Baseball players at the 1996 Summer Olympics
Olympic bronze medalists for the United States in baseball
Medalists at the 1996 Summer Olympics
All-American college baseball players